No Boundaries may refer to:

Music

Albums
 No Boundaries (The 5 Browns album)
 No Boundaries (Michael Angelo Batio album)
 No Boundaries (Eva Cassidy album)
 No Boundaries (Sertab Erener album)
 No Boundaries (Ladysmith Black Mambazo album)
 No Boundaries (Natalie MacMaster album)
 No Boundaries (Alexander Rybak album)
 No Boundaries: A Benefit for the Kosovar Refugees, an album

Other
 "No Boundaries" (song), the American Idol season 8 winner's song, recorded by Kris Allen and by Adam Lambert
 No Boundaries (contest), a national competition sponsored by USA Today and NASA

See also 
 No Boundaries International